Lupinus brevicaulis is a species of lupine known by the common names shortstem lupine and sand lupine. It is native to the southwestern United States and Great Basin area and into northern Mexico, where it grows in many types of sandy habitat. This is a hairy annual herb growing nearly flat in a spread on the ground with a stem just a few centimeters long. An array of leaves encircles the base. Each palmate leaf is made up of 6 to 8 leaflets about a centimeter long and a few millimeters in width. The inflorescence is a petite spiral of flowers a few centimeters long just arising past the basal disc of leaves. Each flower is 6 to 8 millimeters long and bright blue in color, generally with a white or yellowish spot on its banner. The fruit is a hairy legume pod about a centimeter long containing 1 or 2 beanlike seeds.

External links
Jepson Manual Treatment
Photo gallery

brevicaulis
Flora of the Western United States
Flora of Mexico
Flora without expected TNC conservation status